For the cargo ship of the same name, see SS Flying Enterprise

Flying Enterprise was a Danish Charter operator, established in Copenhagen in 1959 by two former SAS-employees who wanted to challenge their former employer because of SAS, at the time, negative attitude towards charter operations. It went bankrupt after a few years of operation. The company was taken over by the Danish tycoon, Simon Spies, who formed his own Charter Line, Conair of Scandinavia renaming the Flying Enterprise in 1965.

The company operated a fleet consisting of four DC-7 and five Canadair North Star.

References

1959 establishments in Denmark
Airlines established in 1959
Defunct airlines of Denmark
1965 disestablishments in Denmark
Airlines disestablished in 1965